Lingshi County is a county of southwest-central Shanxi province, China. It is under the administration of Jinzhong city.

Climate

References

www.xzqh.org 

 
County-level divisions of Shanxi
Jinzhong